Fremont Township is a township in Lake County, Illinois, USA.  As of the 2010 census, its population was 32,337.

History
The township was formed about 1849. A number of names were suggested, and eventually the name Fremont was adopted in honor of the western explorer John C. Frémont.

Geography
Lakes in this township include Countryside Lake, Davis Lake, Diamond Lake, Lake Fairfield and Schreiber Lake.

Villages
 Grayslake
 Hawthorn Woods
 Libertyville
 Long Grove
 Mundelein
 North Barrington
 Round Lake
 Wauconda

Adjacent townships
 Avon Township (north)
 Warren Township (northeast)
 Libertyville Township (east)
 Vernon Township (southeast)
 Ela Township (south)
 Cuba Township (southwest)
 Wauconda Township (west)
 Grant Township (northwest)

Cemeteries
The township contains five cemeteries: Ivanhoe, Saint Marys Catholic, Transfiguration Catholic, Union and United States Naval.

Major highways
 U.S. Route 12
 U.S. Route 45
 Illinois State Route 60
 Illinois State Route 83
 Illinois State Route 137
 Illinois State Route 176

Airports and landing strips
 Air Estates Airport
 Campbell Airport

Demographics

References
 U.S. Board on Geographic Names (GNIS)
 United States Census Bureau cartographic boundary files

External links
 Fremont Township official website
 US-Counties.com
 City-Data.com
 US Census
 Illinois State Archives

Townships in Lake County, Illinois
Townships in Illinois